Kat Perkins is an American singer from Scranton, North Dakota. She appeared on The Voice season 6 and advanced to the television show's semi-finals. She released her first single in August 2014.

Early life and education
Kat Perkins was born and raised in Scranton, North Dakota. She is the daughter of Mark Perkins, a music teacher, and Gayle Perkins, an organist. As a child, Kat Perkins sang harmonies with her sister Kelly and took piano lessons. She began performing professionally at the age of fifteen.

Career
In 1999, Perkins graduated from high school and joined the Medora Musical, a musical production performed in North Dakota. She moved to Twin Cities, Minnesota to attend cosmetology school, where she began working in Hey City Theater Productions.

Perkins fronted Scarlet Haze, a band from Twin Cities, Minnesota. In 2005, the band opened for Bon Jovi at the Target Center in Minneapolis. Perkins had surgery on her vocal cords, which resulted in a three-year hiatus from her singing career. She began working as a full-time nanny for a family with five children in Twin Cities During her off time, Perkins traveled to the Middle East with other musicians to entertain American military troops in 2013.

Perkins was chosen to audition for The Voice season 6 in Los Angeles, California, after producers saw a video of her singing Adele's "Someone Like You" on YouTube. In October 2013, Perkins was selected for The Voice's blind auditions. Perkins performed "Gold Dust Woman" at the television show's blind audition, and received interest from three judges. She chose Adam Levine as her coach, who led her to the semi-finals. Perkins was saved from elimination twice by audience votes via Twitter, before being eliminated from The Voice in May 2014. Perkins was part of the most tweeted-about moment in history of a television show.

In August 2014, Perkins released her first single, "Fearless". The week following the single's release, "Fearless" placed in the top five on iTunes rock chart. "Fearless" also qualified for the first round of the Grammy Awards "Best Rock Song and Best Rock Performance" competition. Her experience on The Voice inspired Perkins to write the song. In September 2014, Perkins and EduTech partnered with the "Positive Social Media Tour" to visit schools across the United States to discuss social media with students and give a live performance. Perkins began touring her single and songs from The Voice in October 2014. That month, she sang the national anthem at a Minnesota Vikings football game.

The Voice (2014)

Discography

Studio albums

Extended plays

Singles

As featured artist

Promotional singles

Other charted songs

References

Notes

Citations

American women singer-songwriters
People from Bowman County, North Dakota
Living people
21st-century American singers
21st-century American women singers
Singer-songwriters from North Dakota
Singer-songwriters from South Dakota
Year of birth missing (living people)
The Voice (franchise) contestants